Safirio Madzikatire, also known as Mukadota, was a multi-disciplinary artist specialising in comedy and music. His nickname comes from his role as Mukadota Baba VaRwizi on The Mukadota Family, a Shona TV drama which ran on Zimbabwe Broadcasting Television (ZTV) in the 1980s and early 1990s.

References

Zimbabwean male television actors
Living people
Year of birth missing (living people)
20th-century Zimbabwean male actors
Place of birth missing (living people)